Geir Hoff (born 14 February 1965 in Bergen, Norway) is a Norwegian retired ice hockey player.

Hoff began his career in Sweden for Västra Frölunda before spending two seasons at Michigan State University.  Hoff then played in the Norwegian Elitserien for Vålerenga Ishockey, Furuset Ishockey, Lillehammer IK and the Spektrum Flyers between 1987 and 1995 before returning to Vålerenga for a second spell, eventually retiring in 1999.

He was also a member of the Norwegian national ice hockey team, and  participated at the Winter Olympics in 1988, 1992, and 1994. He was Norwegian champion in 1988, 1990, 1994, 1998, and 1999. He was awarded Gullpucken as best Norwegian ice hockey player in 1991.

References

External links

1965 births
Living people
Frölunda HC players
Furuset Ishockey players
Ice hockey players at the 1988 Winter Olympics
Ice hockey players at the 1992 Winter Olympics
Ice hockey players at the 1994 Winter Olympics
Lillehammer IK players
Michigan State Spartans men's ice hockey players
Norwegian ice hockey left wingers
Norwegian expatriate ice hockey people
Olympic ice hockey players of Norway
Sportspeople from Bergen
Spektrum Flyers players
Vålerenga Ishockey players
NCAA men's ice hockey national champions